The Type 76 twin 37mm naval gun is a small caliber naval artillery piece from the People's Republic of China. The Type 76A was in naval service in the 1990s.

References

 
Naval weaponry of the People's Republic of China
Naval anti-aircraft guns
Naval guns of China
Military equipment introduced in the 1990s